The Warrior Hotel is a historic hotel opened in 1930 and restored in 2020, located in downtown Sioux City, Iowa, United States.

Description
The building was designed by Kansas City architect Alonzo H. Gentry in the Art Deco style. The brick exterior features terra cotta ornamentation. The hotel opened on December 20, 1930, built by the Eppley Hotel Company. Eppley was bought by Sheraton Hotels in 1956, and the hotel was renamed the Sheraton-Warrior. Sheraton remodeled the hotel in 1962, moving the lobby from the second floor to the ground floor and converting the hotel to a motel, renaming it the Sheraton-Warrior Motor Inn. In 1968, Sheraton sold the hotel to Gotham Hotels Limited, along with seventeen other aging properties, and it was renamed the Warrior Motor Inn. The hotel closed in 1971 following a strike by employees, but was sold and reopened the following year as the Aventino Motor Inn. It closed permanently in 1976. It was listed on the National Register of Historic Places in 1985.

The structure was tagged for building violations in the late 1990s, but was given a reprieve by the city due to its historical significance and the estimated $5 million it would cost to demolish. In 2006, the interior was gutted in preparation for converting the building into low-income senior housing, but the project stalled for lack of financing.

In November 2012, a group led by the Winnebago Tribe of Nebraska applied for a gaming license for a proposed $122-million casino and entertainment complex that would integrate the Warrior and the neighboring Davidson Building. State gaming regulators rejected the bid, awarding the license instead to a Hard Rock Casino to be built at the city's historic Battery Building.

In July 2017, Restoration St. Louis & Warrior ownership announced a plan to renovate the Warrior Hotel and adjacent Davidson Building into a 148-room Marriott Autograph Hotel at an estimated $73M. The hotel reopened in September 2020.

References

External links
The Warrior Hotel - official website 
The Warrior Hotel - official chain website

Hotel buildings completed in 1930
Hotels established in 1930
Buildings and structures in Sioux City, Iowa
National Register of Historic Places in Sioux City, Iowa
Hotel buildings on the National Register of Historic Places in Iowa
Art Deco architecture in Iowa
Sheraton hotels
1930 establishments in Iowa